A long-lived tornado outbreak sequence affected the Southern Plains, the southeastern and Middle Atlantic region of the United States from May 7–11, 2008. The storm produced 120 confirmed tornadoes starting on May 7 and lasting until late on May 11. The outbreak sequence killed 28 people across several states; 25 were killed by tornadoes. The event occurred less than a week after a deadly tornado outbreak that principally affected the state of Arkansas and killed 7 people.

Meteorological synopsis

The event started in Oklahoma on May 7 as an initial low pressure crossed the southern Plains and produced tornadoes across the Oklahoma City area producing scattered damage throughout the Metro Area including in Yukon, Bethany, Warr Acres and north Oklahoma City. KOCO-TV recorded a  wind gust while Chief Meteorologist Rick Mitchell was reporting on the storm. Widespread tree, fence, and minor property damage was reported throughout much of the area while there was also a gas leak reported in Bethany. Tree damage was also reported just outside the KFOR and KOCO stations. Similar conditions occurred south and east of Tulsa, Oklahoma, as the line of thunderstorms raced across the state and caused similar damage although a portions of a storage structure was destroyed by the force of the winds. At least five tornadoes were confirmed throughout the state but all were rated either EF0 or EF1. There were no reports of injuries during the event.

Two significant tornado outbreaks affected the southeastern United States on May 8. During the morning hours, tornadoes touched down across northeastern Mississippi including one EF3 tornado in the Tupelo, Mississippi area which heavily damaged several buildings near the Tupelo Airport.  Tornadoes also touched down across northwestern Alabama north and west of Birmingham and Huntsville. One particular tornado was caught on tape by a security camera at a business near Leighton in Colbert County which overturned cars at a parking lot. Another tornado crossed very near the ABC 33-40 Sky Cam in Cullman but the tornado was not seen as very strong winds stopped the video data prior to its passage. Structural damage was also reported to homes across the area.

While weak tornadoes touched down north of Xenia, Ohio, during the early evening hours, the second outbreak of the day produced several strong tornadoes across the western Carolinas and southwestern Virginia. A line of showers and thunderstorms moved across the Appalachians. CAPE values were at around 1500 j/kg across parts of North Carolina. One tornado hit the Clemmons, North Carolina area producing EF3 damage to several homes. The same area was hit an F3 tornado on the same date in 1998. Just after 11:00 pm, another tornado from the same supercell struck the western Greensboro region, killing one person inside a truck overturned by the tornado. The storm also damaged several buildings including homes, businesses and warehouses. Two Fed-Fex planes at the Piedmont Triad International Airport were pitched off the tarmac as the storm lifted near the area. Other tornadoes produced some significant damage north of the Piedmont Triad region across southern Virginia.

On May 10, a new wave of tornadoes from a second system affected portions of the southern Plains and the Lower-Mississippi Valley. Temperatures across the region reached the 80s across portions of the South with mostly upper 70s elsewhere. CAPE values were between 1000 and 2000 j/kg near the center of the low with reading over 2000 j/kg across Mississippi. Helicity levels were over 250. A moderate risk of severe storms was issued for a large portions of the Mississippi Valley as well as the Eastern Plains. Severe storms began to occur across northwestern Arkansas, southeastern Kansas and eastern Oklahoma during the late afternoon hours. Tornado watches extended from eastern Oklahoma to South Carolina and north to near Kansas City.

One violent EF4 tornado killed 15 people in Missouri and six people in northeastern Oklahoma, with one other death from an EF1 tornado also in Missouri. Moderate to major damage was reported across Ottawa County, Oklahoma, and Newton County, Missouri, as well as in Stuttgart, Arkansas, and near McAlester, Oklahoma, where a tornado was caught on tape by a television crew from a helicopter. Other tornadoes were reported across Missouri, Oklahoma, Arkansas and Kansas. In the late evening, after crossing the Mississippi River, the supercells combined into a bow echo/derecho that tracked from the Memphis Metropolitan Area then across northern Mississippi, Alabama, Georgia and South Carolina, with widespread wind damage and embedded tornadoes. Two people were killed in Laurens County, Georgia, and at least 85,000 customers were left without power in the Atlanta metropolitan area.

Additional tornadoes touched down across the southeast and the eastern Ohio Valley from central Ohio to North Carolina but the bulk of the activity took place across central and southern Georgia where nearly 20 tornadoes were confirmed in that state alone. One tornado went through the city of Macon, Georgia, causing extensive damage to some buildings at Macon State College. This forced the closure of the Macon campus for repair. A violent EF4 tornado was also confirmed near Darien in McIntosh County where numerous buildings near Interstate 95 were heavily damaged or destroyed. This was the first violent tornado in Georgia since an F4 tornado hit four counties north of Atlanta on March 27, 1994. The tornado that occurred during the Palm Sunday tornado outbreak of 1994 killed three and injured 20 over a nearly 50-mile path. Georgia Governor Sonny Perdue declared a state of emergency for at least six counties across the state. In addition to the tornado fatalities, one person was killed due to straight line winds in Barrow County, Georgia.

Confirmed tornadoes

Picher, Oklahoma/Neosho, Missouri

The deadliest tornado and most notable tornado of the outbreak took place from a single supercell that tracked through Ottawa County, Oklahoma, Newton County, Missouri, and Barry County, Missouri, in the late afternoon of May 10. Twenty-one people were killed in the tornado – fatalities took place in Picher, Oklahoma (where six people were killed), and Newton and Barry counties in Missouri (where 15 people were killed). One other person was killed in Jasper County, Missouri from an EF1 tornado. Eight of the victims died inside their cars, troubling experts who say the inside of a vehicle is one of the worst places to be during a tornado. This was the second deadliest tornado of the year behind the EF3 tornado that affected areas northeast of Nashville, Tennessee, on February 5, 2008 and killed 22.

The tornado first touched down near the Kansas–Oklahoma border in Oklahoma southwest of Chetopa, Kansas and tracked eastward. It then slammed into Picher with devastating results. Twenty blocks of the town suffered extensive damage with houses and businesses destroyed or flattened, and some swept away. The damage in Picher was rated EF4. At least 150 others were injured in Picher alone. The tornado continued eastward, passing just north of Quapaw and Peoria before crossing Interstate 44 into Missouri. This was the deadliest tornado in Oklahoma since the South Oklahoma City F5 tornado on May 3, 1999 which killed 36.

Most of the fatalities in Missouri were reported near the Racine community at the intersection of Route 43 and Iris Road, northwest of Neosho, where automobiles were thrown as far as 1/2 mile (800 m) away. Nearly 20 people were hospitalized in Newton County. It was the deadliest single tornado in Missouri since a tornado hit the St. Louis Metro area on February 10, 1959 killing 21 and the deadliest outbreak for that state since May 4, 2003 where 19 were killed. The Joplin tornado, which devastated the city of Joplin, just a few miles north of the path of this tornado, killed 158 people, which made it the 7th deadliest in US history, and the 26th deadliest in recorded history.

The tornado continued eastward toward Granby, Missouri. It passed very close to the intersection of US 60 and Route 59 about three miles west of Granby, destroying a church building and numerous homes/buildings as it passed through.  The Tornado continued southeastward and crossed Route B about 1 mile south of Granby.  The area surrounding Granby's cemetery and rodeo grounds took heavy damage.  The tornado continued eastward toward the village of Newtonia.  There were no reported storm related deaths in the area surrounding Granby.

Preliminary information from the National Weather Service office in Springfield, Missouri, suggested the Newton County tornado was a violent tornado. The preliminary rating was EF3, but it was later upgraded to EF4 according to a later survey. The tornado continued into Barry County, where one person was killed in Purdy. In Barry County, several buildings were damaged including numerous houses, a church, four mobile homes and many outbuildings. The tornado lifted just southeast of McDowell. Debris from the storm such as letters, bills and foam traveled as far east as the Springfield area about 80 miles (130 km) to the east of the hardest hit region in southwestern Missouri.

Oklahoma Governor Brad Henry sent National Guard Troops as well as emergency personnel to assist the hardest hit area in Picher where a 20-block area suffered major damage including several destroyed structures. Damage was reported near Peoria and Quapaw. Governor Henry and as well as US Homeland Security Secretary Michael Chertoff visited the tornado-ravaged area in the following days. Chertoff told that "it looks like a small nuclear bomb went off". Federal and state officials confirmed there would be no funding for rebuilding the town. Governor Henry did however requested a federal disaster declaration for storm victims. Before the tornado hit the town, the government had planned to buy-out homes in the area which was the site of a large zinc mine.

See also
 List of North American tornadoes and tornado outbreaks
 Tornado outbreak of May 1–2, 2008
 Tornado outbreak sequence of May 22–31, 2008

References

External links
 Slide show of storm damage across the Piedmont Triad Region on May 8 (Courtesy of WXII 12)

Tornadoes of 2008
F4 tornadoes by date
 ,2008-05-07
Tornadoes in Alabama
Tornadoes in Georgia (U.S. state)
Tornadoes in Missouri
Tornadoes in North Carolina
Tornadoes in Oklahoma
Tornadoes in Virginia
Newton County, Missouri
Ottawa County, Oklahoma
Natural disasters in Oklahoma
Natural disasters in Missouri
May 2008 events in North America